The 2016 Ghanaian Premier League was the 60th season of top professional association football in Ghana. The domestic league season began on 21 January and concluded on 18 September with Wa All Stars winning their first league title. Only the matches between Asante Kotoko and the Hearts of Oak attracted attendances above 10,000.

Teams
The Ghanaian Premier League comprises 16 sides, of which the bottom three - Hasaacas, New Edubiase and Techiman City - will be relegated to the Division One.

Stadia and locations

League table

Positions by round

Top scorers

Updated to games played on 18 September 2016 Source: Global Sports Archive

Hat-tricks

References

Ghana Premier League seasons
Ghanaian Premier League
Ghanaian Premier League
1
1